Tabby is an open source platform for vehicles by OSVehicle. The project is released under Creative Commons BY-SA license and the CAD files can be downloaded from the official website, last release was in May 2015. The chassis can be assembled in less than 45 minutes and is able to carry two to four passengers.

See also
Open-source hardware
Open design
Open-source car
OScar

References

External links

Official photo channel
Bloomberg
Smithsonian
Al Volante
Motori.it
Quattroruote
Repubblica
Autofocus
Riders

Open hardware vehicles
Car models